The Wimmersperg Spz ("Sp" stands for STEN-pistole, "z" for zweiteilig. English: Sten pistol, made of two parts) was a family of German assault rifles that was in the planning stage during the latter days of Nazi Germany.

Overview 
The overall weapon is largely made up from Sten Mk II submachine gun components (which the Germans copied as Gerät Potsdam), most notably the receiver and buttstock. The magazine and magazine release are from the StG-44, and so were the barrel blanks. There were three variants designed. The Spz-l (lange Bauart, long variant) used a conventional layout with separate pistol grip, while in the Spz-kr (kurze Bauart mit Regler für Serienfeuer, short model with burst-fire switch) and Spz-kv (kurze Bauart mit Verschlußzündung, striker-fired short model) the magazine itself was the pistol grip. The Spz-l and Spz-kr were hammer-fired, while the Spz-kv was striker-fired. All variants were gas-operated, had swappable barrels, and were designed for selective fire. Single-shot fire could be applied by pulling the trigger half way, while pulling the trigger further to the rear produced burst fire (except Spz-l). This function predates the similar operation used on the present day Steyr AUG series of rifles.

There is no trace of these weapons in official Nazi documents or even in some German manufacturer's archives. Wimmersperg however had contacts with Mauser, Simson & Co, and Fokker for some of his other designs. It is possible that Wimmersperg designed the Spz's on behalf of the metal goods factory Spreewerke.

Currently, there is only one true-to-scale museum grade replica of the Spz-l in the world. This was reconstructed in full scale by a German designer on the basis of the original construction plans and then built by him.

The gun was designed by Heinrich von Wimmersperg of Austria, who after World War II, moved to Detroit, USA. He also designed the Wimmersperg Maschinengewehr in 1937, a double-barreled, combined gas/recoil operated firearm fed from either magazines or a belt feed with 7.92×57mm cartridges — which was unusual for that the top barrel acted as a gas piston. The over/under barrels fire and reload vice versa. In his later years, he patented designs for car seats for infants and toddlers.

See also
List of assault rifles
Interdynamics MKS - Same weapon with similar configuration

References

7.92×33mm Kurz assault rifles
World War II infantry weapons of Germany
Research and development in Nazi Germany
Rifles of Germany